The 1957 Cork Senior Hurling Championship was the 69th staging of the Cork Senior Hurling Championship since its establishment by the Cork County Board in 1887. The competition was held between 31 March and 15 September 1957.

Blackrock were the defending champions, however, they were defeated by Glen Rovers in the second round.

On 15 September 1957, Sarsfields won the championship following a 5–10 to 4–6 defeat of University College Cork in the final. It was their second championship title overall and their first title in six championship seasons.

Paddy Barry  was the championship's top scorer with 7-11.

Results

First round

Second round

Semi-finals

Final

Championship statistics

Top scorers

Top scorer overall

Top scorers in a single game

Miscellaneous

 The final is the first since 1928 to not future a city club.
 University College Cork, then known as Collegians, qualify for the final for the first time since 1915.
 Seandún qualify for the semi-final for the first time since 1934.

References

Cork Senior Hurling Championship
Cork Senior Hurling Championship